This is a comprehensive discography of Atmosphere, a Minneapolis, Minnesota-based underground hip hop group formed in 1996.

Studio albums

Extended plays

Compilation albums

Sad Clown/Bad Dub series
Between major releases, Atmosphere has released various live albums and EPs of unreleased material under the "Sad Clown/Bad Dub" title.

 Sad Clown Bad Dub (1999)
 Sad Clown Bad Dub II (2000)
 Sad Clown Bad Dub 3 (2002)
 Sad Clown Bad Dub 4 DVD (2002)
 Sad Clown Bad Dub 5 (2003)
 Sad Clown Bad Dub 6 (2003)
 Random Vol. 3/Sad Clown Bad Dub 7 (2003)
 Happy Clown Bad Dub 8/Fun EP (2006)
 Sad Clown Bad Summer 9 (2007)
 Sad Clown Bad Fall 10 (2007)
 Sad Clown Bad Winter 11 (2007)
 Sad Clown Bad Spring 12 (2008)
 Sad Clown Bad Dub 13 DVD (2008)

Singles

References

General

Specific

External links

Hip hop discographies
Discographies of American artists